Balilla Lombardi (1 April 1916 – 3 March 1987) was an Italian professional football player.

He played 4 seasons (17 games, 1 goal) in the Serie A for A.S. Roma, A.S. Bari and A.C. Venezia. Lombardi died in March 1987 at the age of 70.

References

1916 births
1987 deaths
A.C. Ancona players
U.S. Pistoiese 1921 players
A.S. Roma players
S.S.C. Bari players
Italian footballers
Serie A players
Palermo F.C. players
F.C. Grosseto S.S.D. players
Venezia F.C. players
Association football midfielders